Party Intellectuals is the debut album by jazz fusion trio Marc Ribot's Ceramic Dog. It was produced by Joel Hamilton and released June 24, 2008 on Pi Recordings.

Reception

Response was generally positive, with Metacritic assigning the album an aggregate score of 80 out of 100 based on 10 critical reviews indicating "Generally favorable reviews".

The Allmusic review by Sean Westergaard awarded the album 4½ stars out of 5, stating, "Although Ribot has always displayed a great sense of humor, it's on full display here in a way it hasn't really been before. Party Intellectuals is easily Ribot's most fun album to date and one of his best".

PopMatters' Zeth Lundy rated the album 7 out of 10, saying,

Track listing
All compositions are by Marc Ribot, except where noted.
 "Break On Through" (John Densmore, Robbie Krieger, Ray Manzarek, Jim Morrison) – 3:44
 "Party Intellectuals" (Shahzad Ismaily, Ribot, Ches Smith) – 5:50
 "Todo el Mundo es Kitsch" – 5:11
 "When We Were Young and We Were Freaks" (Emilio Cubierto, Ismaily, Ribot, Smith) – 8:18
 "Digital Handshake" (Ismaily, Ribot, Smith, Alessandro Stefana) – 10:15
 "Bateau" – 4:15
 "For Malena" – 3:20
 "Pinch" (Ismaily, Ribot, Smith) – 4:43
 "Girlfriend" (Ismaily, Ribot, Smith) – 3:35
 "Midost" – 10:04
 "Shsh Shsh" (Ismaily, Ribot, Jenni Quilter) – 5:49
 "Never Better" – 3:29

Personnel
Marc Ribot – guitar, vocals
Shahzad Ismaily – bass guitar, vocals, Moog synthesizer
Ches Smith – drum kit, percussion, vocals, electronics
Janice Cruz – vocals
Jenni Quilter – vocals
Martín Verajano – percussion

References

Marc Ribot albums
2008 albums
Pi Recordings albums